Sture Ericson (27 September 1912 – 15 March 1979) was a Swedish film actor. He was born in Salem, Sweden and died in Stockholm.

Filmography

References

External links

1912 births
1979 deaths
Swedish male film actors
20th-century Swedish male actors